Argonauts of the Western Pacific: An Account of Native Enterprise and Adventure in the Archipelagoes of Melanesian New Guinea is a 1922 ethnological work by Bronisław Malinowski, which has had enormous impact on the ethnographic genre. The book is about the Trobriand people who live on the small Kiriwana island chain northeast of the island of New Guinea. It is part of Malinowski's trilogy on the Trobrianders, including The Sexual Life of Savages in North-Western Melanesia (1929) and Coral Gardens and Their Magic (1935).

Overview
The book consists of twenty-two chapters divided into six distinct sections. General summaries of each section are included below.

 Introduction: Malinowski's famous general statement of the aims of ethnography
 Chapters I-III: setting the scene and sketching the structure; from the broad survey of Kula District (I) to intensive fieldwork (II-III); "native" life (II), structural overview of the kula (III)
 Chapters IV-XVI: the kula by example; "a consecutive narrative" from the earliest preparations of canoe-building through extended voyaging from Sinaketa to Dobu and back
 Chapters XVII-XVIII: on magic and language
 Chapters XIX-XXI: three permutations of basic kula pattern: the inland kula (XIX), a Kiriwina-Kitava expedition (XX), and "the remaining branches and offshoots of the kula" (XXI)
 Chapter XXII: a summary statement of "the meaning of the kula"

Development

Argonauts of the Western Pacific developed from anthropological research which would be later described as "off the verandah". Unlike the armchair anthropology of previous researchers, this method was characterized by participant observation: informal interviews, direct observation, participation in the life of the group, collective discussions, analyses of personal documents produced within the group, self-analysis, results from activities undertaken off or online, and life-histories.

Impact
It was widely regarded as a masterpiece and significantly boosted Malinowski's reputation in the world of academia. It has been described as an "instant classic"; already James George Frazer in his preface to the first edition compared Malinowski's impact on ethnography to that of Shakespeare on literature.

Considered the first modern ethnography, Argonauts of the Western Pacific redefined the ethnographic genre. Adam Kuper, in his seminal 1973 book on British social anthropology, begins his analysis with Malinowski's status as the founder of the discipline:

Malinowski has a strong claim to being the founder of the profession of social anthropology in Britain, for he established its distinctive apprenticeship -- intensive fieldwork in an exotic community.

Many other anthropologists also trace the fieldwork mandate back to Malinowski, including Murray Wax:

In the final analysis, the major credit for discovering the technique of intensive personal fieldwork among a single people must go to Bronislaw Malinowski (1884-1942). His researches among the Trobriand Islanders during the years 1916-18 yielded a series of epochal volumes which revolutionized the content and practice of anthropology.

Today, Argonauts of the Western Pacific is the archetypal account of anthropologists' "following the people" method of collecting information for a multi-sited ethnography.

References

External links

Downloadable copy from Wolne Lektury

1922 non-fiction books
Anthropology books
Books by Bronisław Malinowski
Books about Oceania
History of New Guinea
Trobriand Islands
Routledge books